Permanent Revolution is the title for ska band Catch 22's fourth studio album, released on June 27, 2006 (July 18, 2006, in Canada).

Background
Permanent Revolution was recorded in January 2006.

Composition
The album can be classified as a concept album, centered on the life of Leon Trotsky (1879–1940), with the title being named after Trotsky's theory of permanent revolution.

Release
Catch 22 appeared at the Ska Weekend festival in April 2006; following this, they went on a US tour with Patent Pending. On April 25, 2006, Permanent Revolution was announced for release in two months' time. A music video was filmed for "Party Song (1917)" in New York City on June 10, 2006; that same day, "A Minor Point" was posted on the band's Myspace profile. Preceded by a promotional e-card and a stream of the whole album, Permanent Revolution was released on June 27, 2006 through Victory Records. A limited edition 7" vinyl of "Party Song (1917)" was released, available through pre-orders at Interpunk and F.Y.E. In July and August 2006, the band appeared on the Summer of Ska Tour in the US and Canada, alongside Voodoo Glow Skulls, Big D and the Kids Table, Suburban Legends, and Westbound Train. Following this, they supported Less Than Jake on their headlining US tour until October 2006. They closed out the year with five headlining East Coast shows, with support from Patent Pending, Bomb the Music Industry!, and Whole Wheat Bread. In May 2007, they appeared at The Bamboozle festival. At the end of the year, they went on tour with Patent Pending.

Track listing

Personnel
Pat Kays – bass guitar, chimes, vocals
Pat Calpin – guitar
Ian McKenzie – trombone, vocals, keys, vibraphone
Ryan Eldred – tenor saxophone, lead vocals, guitar
Kevin Gunther – trumpet, vocals
Chris Greer – percussion

References

External links
Official Website
Band MySpace
Interview With Ryan Eldred

Catch 22 (band) albums
2006 albums
Concept albums
Political music albums by American artists
Victory Records albums
Cultural depictions of Leon Trotsky
Albums produced by Steve Evetts